Hill Point, also known as Hillpoint, is an unincorporated community in Sauk County, Wisconsin, United States.

Description

Hill Point is located on Wisconsin Highway 154 west of Loganville, in the town of Washington. Hill Point has a post office with ZIP code 53937. The community was formerly known as Tuckerville, after one William Tucker.

References

External links

Unincorporated communities in Sauk County, Wisconsin
Unincorporated communities in Wisconsin